"Highbinder" commonly refers to a "hit man" in a Chinese-American criminal gang. 

Highbinders may refer to two films:

 The Highbinders, a 1915 American short crime film
 The Medallion (working title: Highbinders), a 2003 Gordon Chan action-comedy film starring Jackie Chan